René Hebinger (22 June 1921 – 19 August 2008) was a French footballer. He competed in the men's tournament at the 1948 Summer Olympics.

Football career
Born in Bourtzwiller Hebinger played for local club FC Mulhouse as striker. He joined Basel's first team during their 1949–50 season. After playing in one test game, he played his Nationalliga A debut for his new club in the home game at the Landhof on 16 April 1950 as Basel won 3–2 against Lugano.

In his one season by Basel, Hebinger played a total of four games for Basel scoring one goal. Three of these games were in the Nationalliga A and the other was a friendly game. He scored this goal on 10 April 1950 in a tournament in Liège against LASK (Linzer Athletik-Sport-Klub) as Basel were defeated 1–3.

Following his time in Basel Hebinger returned to play for Mulhouse.

References

Sources
 Die ersten 125 Jahre. Publisher: Josef Zindel im Friedrich Reinhardt Verlag, Basel. 
 Verein "Basler Fussballarchiv" Homepage

External links
 

1921 births
2008 deaths
FC Mulhouse players
FC Basel players
French footballers
Olympic footballers of France
Footballers at the 1948 Summer Olympics
Sportspeople from Haut-Rhin
Association football forwards
Footballers from Alsace
French expatriate footballers
French expatriate sportspeople in Switzerland
Expatriate footballers in Switzerland